The 2016 Harvard Crimson football team represented Harvard University during the 2016 NCAA Division I FCS football season. They were led by 23rd-year head coach Tim Murphy and played their home games at Harvard Stadium. They were a member of the Ivy League. They finished the season 7–3 overall and 5–2 in Ivy League play to place third. Harvard averaged 14,741 fans per game.

Schedule

Ranking movements

References

Harvard
Harvard Crimson football seasons
Harvard Crimson football
Harvard Crimson football